Salem Hill is an American  progressive rock band based in the Nashville, Tennessee area.

Members
 Michael Dearing: vocals, guitars, keys
 Carl Groves: vocals, guitars, keys
 Patrick Henry: vocals, bass
 Kevin Thomas: vocals, drums

Former members
 Michael Ayers: vocals, keys

Discography
 The Unseen Cord/Thicker Than Water (2015)
 Pennies In The Karma Jar (2010)
 Mystery Loves Company (Live DVD) (2005)
 Mimi’s Magic Moment (2005)
 Be (Oarfin Records, 2003)
 Puppet Show (2003)
 Different Worlds (2001 Cyclops Records, Remaster of Salem Hill II)
 Not Everybody's Gold (Lazarus Records, 2000)
 The Robbery Of Murder (Lazarus Records, 1998)
 Catatonia (1997)
 Salem Hill II (1994)
 Salem Hill (1993)

External links
 Salem Hill official site
 Salem Hill on Yahoo Music

American progressive rock groups